NGC 4093 is an elliptical galaxy located 340 million light-years away in the constellation Coma Berenices. The galaxy was discovered by astronomer Heinrich d'Arrest on May 4, 1864. NGC 4093 is a member of the NGC 4065 Group and is a radio galaxy with a two sided jet.

A rotating disk in the galaxy was detected by K. Geréb et al.

See also
 List of NGC objects (4001–5000)

References

External links

4093
038323
Coma Berenices
Astronomical objects discovered in 1864
Elliptical galaxies
NGC 4065 Group
Radio galaxies
Discoveries by Heinrich Louis d'Arrest